Kari Valtonen (born April 26, 1954) is a Finnish chess problemist.

Biography
Valtonen is chess problemist who worked in several genres, including endgame study, helpmate and selfmate. He was one of Finland's chess problem magazine Tehtäväniekka authors. In 1984 in Sarajevo Valtonen won the second individual World Chess Solving Championship. In the same year he gained the title of International Solving Grandmaster. He also is FIDE International Arbiter of Chess Composition. In 2004 Valtonen was the chief judge of chess composition's international tournament in honor of his fifty-year anniversary.

References

External links
 
 Kari Valtonen problems at the PDB-Server

1954 births
Living people
Finnish chess players
International Judges of Chess Compositions
Chess composers
International solving grandmasters
Chess arbiters